The Big East Conference softball tournament (sometimes known simply as the Big East Tournament) is the conference championship tournament in college softball for the Big East Conference.  The winner receives the conference's automatic bid to the NCAA Division I softball tournament.

Tournament
The top four regular season finishers compete in the single-elimination tournament.  Beginning with the tournament's inception in 1990, four teams competed in the tournament.  From 2006 through 2013, the top eight teams qualified for the event.  Beginning in 2014, after the conference split that resulted in the current alignment, the Big East reverted to the four-team tournament.

Champions

Year-by-year

By school

Italics indicate that the school no longer competes in Big East Conference softball.

Notes

References